Natalia Gudina (born 11 November 1977) is an Israeli former competitive ice dancer. Representing Israel with husband Alexei Beletski, she placed as high as 14th at the World Championships, as high as 9th at the European Championships, and competed at the Winter Olympics. She represented Ukraine with her previous partner, Vitali Kurkudym, and won the 1996 World Junior bronze medal.

Career 
Gudina began skating at the age of four. Early in her career, she competed with partner Vitali Kurkudym for Ukraine. They were coached by Alexandr Tumanovsky and Olga Markush. Gudina/Kurkudym won the bronze medal at the 1996 World Junior Championships. Their partnership ended in 1998.

Later in 1998, Gudina teamed up with Alexei Beletski. They competed together for Ukraine until the end of 1998/1999 season, after which they switched to competing for Israel. Gudina and Beletski are the 2000–2005 Israeli national silver medalists and placed 19th at the 2002 Winter Olympics. They were coached by Gennadi Karponosov and Natalia Linichuk.

Personal life 
Gudina and Beletski married in 1999.

Programs

With Beletski

With Kurkudym

Competitive highlights

With Beletski

With Kurkudym

References

External links

 
 Care to Ice Dance: Gudina & Beletski

1977 births
Ukrainian female ice dancers
Israeli female ice dancers
Ukrainian people of Israeli descent
Figure skaters at the 2002 Winter Olympics
Olympic figure skaters of Israel
Sportspeople from Odesa
Living people
World Junior Figure Skating Championships medalists